Far East Broadcasting Company (FEBC) is an international Christian radio network. From 1960 to 1994, FEBC owned and operated shortwave radio station KGEI in San Francisco, California.

Philippines

The Philippines is where FEBC began its initial broadcast.

AM/FM stations

Shortwave
FEBC operates its shortwave broadcasts in different languages, transmitting from its facilities in Bocaue, Bulacan and Iba, Zambales.

South Korea
FEBC owns a number of stations in South Korea, one of them being known as HLAZ.

Indonesia
YASKI is the name for FEBC in Indonesia. It runs a number of stations under the Heartline FM brand.

Russia
FEBC Russia runs a number of stations under the Radio Teos brand.

United Kingdom

FEBA Radio was established in 1959 in the United Kingdom.

Northern Mariana Islands
The FEBC international broadcast station on Saipan in the Commonwealth of the Northern Mariana Islands was established about 1981 and closed in 2011.  The local radio station, KSAI 936 AM, was on air for 24 years until shutting down on April 30, 2002. KSAI was initially established in Saipan by the United States Office of War Information (OWI) in June 1945.

References

Christian mass media companies
Philippine radio networks
Christian radio
International radio networks
La Mirada, California
Mass media companies established in 1945
Pasig